Juergen Brugger from the EPFL - École Polytechnique Fédérale de Lausanne, Switzerland was named Fellow of the Institute of Electrical and Electronics Engineers (IEEE) in 2016 for contributions to micro and nano manufacturing technology.

References

Fellow Members of the IEEE
Living people
Year of birth missing (living people)
Place of birth missing (living people)